Egl nine homolog 3 is a protein that in humans is encoded by the EGLN3 gene. ELGN3 is a member of the superfamily of alpha-ketoglutarate-dependent hydroxylases, which are non-haem iron-containing proteins.

References

Further reading 

 
 
 
 
 
 
 
 
 
 
 
 
 
 
 
 

Human 2OG oxygenases
EC 1.14.11